Carry On Columbus is a 1992 British comedy film, the 31st and final release in the Carry On film series (1958–1992). The film was a belated entry to the series, following 1978's Carry On Emmannuelle. It was produced to coincide with the 500th anniversary of Christopher Columbus' arrival in the Americas (two other more serious films on the subject, 1492: Conquest of Paradise and Christopher Columbus: The Discovery came out the same year).

Plot
Christopher Columbus (Jim Dale) believes he can find an alternative route to the far East and persuades King Ferdinand (Leslie Phillips) and Queen Isabella of Spain (June Whitfield) to finance his expedition. But the Sultan of the Ottoman Empire (Rik Mayall), who makes a great deal of money through taxing the merchants who have to pass through his country on the Silk Road, sends his best spy, Fatima (Sara Crowe), to wreck the trip...

Cast

Production

Casting
Main series regulars present are Jim Dale (in his eleventh Carry On), Peter Gilmore (also in his eleventh), Bernard Cribbins (in his third), Leslie Phillips (in his fourth), Jon Pertwee (in his fourth) and June Whitfield (also in her fourth). The only actor to bridge the gap between Carry On Columbus and the previous entry was Jack Douglas, making his eighth appearance in the series.

Original Carry On performer Frankie Howerd was signed up to appear, but he died shortly before he was due to film his role. His part as the King of Spain was offered to original series regular Bernard Bresslaw, who turned it down. Leslie Phillips eventually took on the role, playing opposite June Whitfield as the Queen, a role turned down by both Joan Sims and Barbara Windsor.

Veteran Carry On performer Kenneth Connor was offered a cameo role in the film but he turned it down, saying "I want to be remembered as a Carry On star, not a Carry On bit-player".

The producers managed to persuade a number of alternative comedians such as Peter Richardson, Alexei Sayle, Rik Mayall, Julian Clary and Nigel Planer (all of whom except Clary are from The Comic Strip) to appear in the film.

This was the last film that Gerald Thomas directed, as he died on 9 November 1993.

Filming and locations

The film was shot between 21 April and 27 May 1992 with interior shooting at Pinewood Studios, Buckinghamshire and location shooting at Frensham Common. The latter location was previously used nearly 30 years earlier for the similarly nautical Carry On Jack.

Reception
The film was panned by critics. Michael Dwyer in The Irish Times described Carry on Columbus as a "flaccid, feeble comeback effort" and a "wretched and pathetic attempt which is singularly unfunny". However, Carry On Columbus took more money at the UK box office (£1,667,249) than the two other Columbus films released in 1992, Christopher Columbus: The Discovery and 1492: Conquest of Paradise, although all three films flopped. Carry On Columbus was also shot on a much lower budget than the other two films, a budget of £2.5 million compared to the other two budgets of $45 million and $47 million respectively.

In a 2004 poll of British film actors, technicians, writers and directors on British cinema, Carry On Columbus
was voted the worst British film ever made.

References

Bibliography

External links

Carry On Columbus at The Whippit Inn

Carry On films
1992 films
British historical comedy films
Films directed by Gerald Thomas
Films scored by John Du Prez
British parody films
British sex comedy films
1990s sex comedy films
1990s historical comedy films
Films set in the 1490s
Fiction set in 1492
Films set in Spain
Films set in pre-Columbian America
British biographical films
Films shot at Pinewood Studios
Films produced by Peter Rogers
Cultural depictions of Christopher Columbus
Cultural depictions of Isabella I of Castile
1992 comedy films
1990s English-language films
1990s British films